Hardap is one of the fourteen regions of Namibia, its capital is Mariental. Hardap contains the municipality of Mariental, the towns Rehoboth and Aranos, and the self-governed villages Gibeon, Gochas, Kalkrand, Stampriet and Maltahöhe. It is home to the Hardap Dam.

Hardap stretches the entire width of Namibia, from the Atlantic Ocean in the west to Namibia's eastern national border. In the northeast, it borders the Kgalagadi District of Botswana, and in the southeast, it borders the Northern Cape Province of South Africa. Domestically, it borders the following regions:
Erongo – northwest
Khomas – north central
Omaheke – northeast
ǁKaras – south

Politics

As of 2020, Hardap had 52,534 registered voters. The region comprises eight political constituencies:
 Gibeon
 Mariental Rural
 Mariental Urban
 Rehoboth Rural
 Rehoboth Urban East
 Rehoboth Urban West
 Aranos (created in 2013)
 Daweb (created in 2013)

As in all other regions, SWAPO was by far the strongest political party since Namibian independence. In February 2009, then-governor Hanse-Himarwa was condemned by the National Society for Human Rights of Namibia for declaring Hardap Region "SWAPO territory" and urging supporters not to allow other political parties to "invade" the region. In the 2004 Presidential election, the region supported Hifikepunye Pohamba of SWAPO with a narrow majority of the votes (52%), following by Ben Ulenga of Congress of Democrats (21%) and Katuutire Kaura of the Democratic Turnhalle Alliance (16%). Four other candidates combined for the 11%.

In the 2015 regional elections SWAPO obtained 65% of the total votes (2010: 60%) and won seven of the eight constituencies with only Rehoboth Urban West narrowly won by the opposition. In the 2020 regional election the Landless People's Movement (LPM, an opposition party formed in 2016) was the strongest party. It obtained 45% of votes overall and won seven of the eight constituencies.

Governors
 Katrina Hanse-Himarwa (2004–2015) 
 Esme Sophia Isaack (2015–2020)
 Salomon April (2020–present)

Economy and infrastructure
Hardap has 55 schools with a total of 21,886 pupils. The region has good infrastructure with well-developed road networks.

Demographics

According to the Namibia 2001 Population and Housing Census, Hardap had a population of 68,249 (33,665 females and 34,579 males or 103 males for every 100 females) growing at an annual rate of 0.3%. The fertility rate was 3.6 children per woman. 46% lived in urban areas while 54% lived in rural areas, and with an area of 109,651 km2, the population density was 0.6 persons per km2. By age, 13% of the population was under 5 years old, 23% between 5 and 14 years, 55% between 15 and 59 years, and 8% 60 years and older. The population was divided into 15,039 households, with an average size of 4.4 persons. 34% of households had a female head of house, while 66% had a male. For those 15 years and older, 54% had never married, 30% married with certificate, 1% married traditionally, 9% married consensually, 2% were divorced or separated, and 4% were widowed.

The most commonly spoken languages at home were Afrikaans (44% of households), and Nama/Damara (44%). For those 15 years and older, the literacy rate was 83%. Nearly half of the population are from coloured and white Namibian groups. In terms of education, 84% of girls and 83% of boys between the ages of 6–15 were attending school, and of those older than 15, 73% had left school, 9% were currently at school, and 13% had never attended.

In 2001 the employment rate for the labor force (64% of those 15+) was 66% employed and 34% unemployed. For those 15+ years old and not in the labor force (29%), 29% were students, 37% home-makers, and 33% retired, too old, etc. According to the 2012 Namibia Labour Force Survey, unemployment in the Hardap Region stood at 28.8%. The two studies are methodologically not comparable.

Among households, 95% had safe water, 34% no toilet facility, 51% electricity for lighting, 77% access to radio, and 20% had wood or charcoal for cooking. In terms of household's main sources of income, 9% derived it from farming, 61% from wages and salaries, 7% cash remittances, 5% from business or non-farming, and 15% from pension.

For every 1000 live births there were 62 female infant deaths and 64 male. The life expectancy at birth was 53 years for females and 51 for males. Among children younger than 15, 4% had lost a mother, 6% a father, and 1% were orphaned by both parents. 6% of the entire population had a disability, of which 19% were deaf, 47% blind, 7% had a speech disability, 10% hand disability, 28% leg disability, and 6% mental disability.

External links

References

Notes

Literature
 

 
Regions of Namibia
Coasts of South Africa